The 1940–41 New York Americans season was the Americans' 16th season of play.

Offseason

Regular season

Final standings

Record vs. opponents

Game log

Playoffs
The Americans did not qualify for the playoffs

Player stats

Regular season
Scoring

Goaltending

Awards and records

Transactions

See also
1940–41 NHL season

References

New York Americans
New York Americans seasons
New
New York Amer
New York Amer
1940s in Manhattan
Madison Square Garden